Twilight is a 1998 American neo-noir thriller film directed by Robert Benton, written by Benton and Richard Russo, and starring Paul Newman, Susan Sarandon, Gene Hackman, Reese Witherspoon, Stockard Channing, and James Garner. The film's original score was composed by Elmer Bernstein. 

It received mixed reviews from critics and was a box office bomb,  grossing $15.1 million against its $20 million budget.

Plot 
Aging private detective Harry Ross, an ex-cop, is working on a case to return 17-year-old runaway Mel Ames to her parents' home. He tracks down Mel and her sleazy boyfriend, Jeff Willis, at a Mexican resort. During a struggle, Mel accidentally shoots Harry with his pistol, striking him in the upper thigh.

The plot picks up two years later, when Ross is living in Southern California in the guest quarters of Mel's wealthy parents, Jack and Catherine Ames. They are former movie stars, now in the twilight of their careers. Jack is dying of cancer, which is out of remission, and he and Ross pass time playing cards.

One day, Jack asks a favor of Harry: to deliver a package to an address in Los Angeles. It turns out to be the first development in a series of twists and turns in a 20-year-old case involving the disappearance of Catherine's ex-husband.

When Harry arrives at the address, he encounters a man named Ivar, who has just been fatally shot and shoots at Harry. Harry is detained by police, including former colleague Lt. Verna Hollander. At the police station, he runs into another (now retired) old pal and colleague, Raymond Hope.

Verna and Raymond are both sympathetic, as they had heard rumors that Harry suffered damage to his genitals when shot in Mexico. Harry explains that he was only shot in the thigh.

Harry likes Catherine, who flirts with him from time to time. He acts as an agent for Jack and Catherine, who are being blackmailed by Jeff, now out of prison, and his parole officer Gloria Lamar.

Harry and Catherine have sex for the first (and only) time. Jack angrily realizes this when he has a heart attack that same night, and Catherine responds to his call for help wearing Harry's shirt.

Harry, meanwhile, is forced to acknowledge that his friends have deceived and manipulated him.

Raymond tries to persuade Harry to get away from it all, but Harry has figured out that Raymond was a conspirator in the murder of Catherine's first husband 20 years before. Raymond shoots at Harry, but Harry kills him first. Following this shooting, Harry reconciles with Catherine and Jack. He leaves town with Verna.

Cast 
 Paul Newman as Harry Ross
 Susan Sarandon as Catherine Ames
 Gene Hackman as Jack Ames
 Reese Witherspoon as Mel Ames
 Stockard Channing as Lieutenant Verna Hollander
 Giancarlo Esposito as Reuben Escobar
 Liev Schreiber as Jeff Willis
 Margo Martindale as Gloria 'Mucho' Lamar
 John Spencer as Captain Phil Egan
 M. Emmet Walsh as Lester Ivar
 James Garner as Raymond Hope
 Clint Howard as EMS Worker

Production 
The working title for Twilight was "The Magic Hour." Principal photography began on November 11, 1996. Parts of the movie were filmed at the Los Angeles Police Department's Hollywood Division Station house in Hollywood, California. Many of the police officers seen in the background are actual police officers. The beach sequences was filmed at Mandalay Beach in Oxnard, California. For Raymond Hope's house, they chose the George Jacobsen House, designed by John Lautner, in the Hollywood Hills. The Ames' house was shot at the Dolores del Río House in Santa Monica, California. The Ames' old family cabin was filmed at the Arch Oboler House, designed by Frank Lloyd Wright, in Malibu, California. Production wrapped in March 1997. Paul Newman gave Susan Sarandon part of his salary after discovering she was being paid less than himself and Gene Hackman.

Release 
Twilight was released in theatres on March 6, 1998, in 1,351 theatres in the U.S., and made $5,866,411 in its opening weekend. While the film featured many notable A-list actors, Twilight'''s budget of $20 million and gross revenue of $15,055,091 indicates that it was a box office bomb after being in theatres for eight weeks.

 Reception 
The film received mixed reviews from critics, as it holds a 61% rating on Rotten Tomatoes based on 59 reviews. The consensus states: "It suffers from a frustratingly deliberate pace, but with nuanced performances from Paul Newman, Gene Hackman, Susan Sarandon and Reese Witherspoon to fall back on, Twilight can't help but be compelling".

Roger Ebert wrote,
"The reason to see the film is to observe how relaxed and serene Paul Newman is before the camera. How, at 73, he has absorbed everything he needs to know about how to be a movie actor, so that at every moment he is at home in his skin, and the skin of his character. It's sad to see all that assurance used in the service of a plot so worn and mechanical."Entertainment Weekly critic Owen Gleiberman gave the film a C+ grade. He wrote it was meant to be "...about the relationship between a semiretired gumshoe (Paul Newman) and two veteran movie stars (Gene Hackman and Susan Sarandon)..." but was more "...about the trio of aging stars who play them."

Barbara Shulgasser of the San Francisco Examiner said that it had a "dazzlingly smart script by Benton and co-writer Richard Russo." She wrote further: "Twilight is as close to a perfect film as I've seen in a long while."

Heather Clisby of Movie Magazine International'' described it as "one of those films where everybody involved seems to have actually cared, thus we have a superb product with memorable characters brought to life by some of the finest actors of our time."

Home media 
The DVD was released on October 7, 1998, in Widescreen. Features included English closed-captioning, Spanish subtitles, and the theatrical trailer, which included scenes that were not in the final edit of the film.

References

External links 
 
 
 
 Twilight at Rotten Tomatoes

1998 films
1998 crime thriller films
1998 crime drama films
1990s thriller drama films
American crime drama films
American crime thriller films
American thriller drama films
Films shot in Los Angeles
Films scored by Elmer Bernstein
Films set in Los Angeles
Films set in Mexico
Films directed by Robert Benton
American detective films
Paramount Pictures films
Films with screenplays by Robert Benton
Films produced by Scott Rudin
American neo-noir films
1990s English-language films
1990s American films